The Awakatek (Aguacateco) are a Maya people in Guatemala, primarily located in the municipality of Aguacatán (Huehuetenango). Their native Awakatek language is related to the Ixil language.

Notes

References
 
 
 

Indigenous peoples in Guatemala
Maya peoples
Mesoamerican cultures
Huehuetenango Department